Ramadan Agab Shareif Ferien (born 20 February 1986) is a Sudanese professional footballer who plays for Al-Merrikh SC as a striker.

International career

International goals
Scores and results list Sudan's goal tally first.

Honours

Clubs
Al-Merrikh SC
Sudan Premier League
Champions (5): 2013, 2015, 2018, 2018–19, 2019–20
Sudan Cup
Winners (4): 2013, 2014, 2015, 2018

References

Living people
1989 births
Sudanese footballers
Sudan international footballers
Association football forwards
Al-Mourada SC players
Al-Merrikh SC players
2012 Africa Cup of Nations players
People from Juba